The North Fork Middle Fork Willamette River as it is officially named but frequently called North Fork of the Willamette River or North Fork of the Middle Fork of the Willamette River has its headwaters at Waldo Lake and flows into the Middle Fork Willamette River northwest of Oakridge.

The river has Oregon's longest covered bridge crossing it at Westfir, the Office Bridge. Portions of the river were designated wild and scenic in 1988.

The river above Westfir is rated as class 3-4 (5) whitewater.

See also
List of Oregon rivers
List of National Wild and Scenic Rivers

References

External links
 
 Reactive map of Middle Fork Willamette watershed (hold mouse just north of Westfir to see lower watershed)

Rivers of Oregon
Wild and Scenic Rivers of the United States
Willamette River
Rivers of Lane County, Oregon